The 2015 French motorcycle Grand Prix was the fifth round of the 2015 Grand Prix motorcycle racing season. It was held at the Bugatti Circuit in Le Mans on 17 May 2015.

In the premier class, Marc Márquez took his third pole position of the season. However, it was Jorge Lorenzo who won his second consecutive race ahead of his teammate Valentino Rossi and Andrea Dovizioso completed the podium in third place. Fourth place was battled between Márquez, Andrea Iannone, and Bradley Smith, with Márquez eventually prevailing ahead of Iannone. Both Team LCR riders failed to finish the race; Cal Crutchlow crashed out at Turn 6 and Jack Miller crashed at the Dunlop chicane. Dani Pedrosa also crashed at the Dunlop chicane but remounted to finish in sixteenth.

In Moto3 Italian rider Francesco Bagnaia took his first ever podium, finishing the race in third place behind Romano Fenati and Enea Bastianini.

Classification

MotoGP

Moto2

Moto3

Championship standings after the race (MotoGP)
Below are the standings for the top six riders and constructors after round five has concluded.

Riders' Championship standings

Constructors' Championship standings

Teams' Championship standings

 Note: Only the top six positions are included for both sets of standings.

References

French
Motorcycle Grand Prix
French motorcycle Grand Prix
French motorcycle Grand Prix